Mohan Mate is an Indian politician and member of the Bharatiya Janata Party. Mate was a member of the Maharashtra Legislative Assembly from 1999 to 2004 and currently 2019 to 2024 representing the Nagpur South (Vidhan Sabha constituency).

He won 2019 Maharashtra Vidhan Sabha election from Nagpur South and got elected as MLA for the 2nd time.

References 

Bharatiya Janata Party politicians from Maharashtra
Maharashtra MLAs 1999–2004
Living people
Year of birth missing (living people)
Maharashtra MLAs 2019–2024